The NEXT Athlete award is given out every year by ESPN the Magazine to one or more athletes chosen as a future leader or trailblazer in their sport. The winning athlete(s) is featured on the cover of the late January issue of ESPN the Magazine.

Historically, the winners of this award have gone on to exceptional careers, or at the very least early success in their careers, with the exception of a few.

Past Winners/Nominees 

Winners After 2009

2010
Kevin Durant

2011
Buster Posey

2012
Cam Newton

2013
Kyrie Irving

References

American sports trophies and awards